Son of Manjeet Singh is a 2018 Indian-Punjabi film directed by Vikram Grover. The film is co-produced by K9 Films and Seven Color Motion Pictures and stars Gurpreet Ghuggi, Karamjit Anmol, Japji Khaira, B.N. Sharma, Harby Sangha and Malkit Rouni in pivotal roles.

Film plot loosely based on Marathi film Shikshanachya Aaicha Gho. The film is produced by comedian Kapil Sharma and Sumeet Singh and was released on 12 October 2018.

Plot
An undefined relationship between father and son of love and dreams that goes beyond all boundaries of struggles to meet the demand of generation gap.

Cast 
 Gurpreet Ghuggi as Manjeet Singh
 B.N. Sharma as B.N. Baggha
 Karamjit Anmol
 Japji Khaira as Preeti
 Harby Sangha
 Malkeet Rauni
 Deep Mandeep
Tania as Simran
 Damanpreet Singh as Jayveer Singh(Manjeet Singh's Son)

Soundtrack

Reception 

Jaspreet Nijher of The Times of India gave 3.5 stars out of 5. Manjit Singh of Santa Banta also gave 3.5 stars out of 5. Sangeet Toor of Film Companion gave 3.0 out of 5.

References

External links

Punjabi remakes of Marathi films
Films about the education system in India
Indian comedy films
2018 comedy films
Punjabi-language Indian films
2010s Punjabi-language films